Frederick Douglass: Prophet of Freedom is a 2018 biography of African-American abolitionist Frederick Douglass, written by historian David W. Blight. It was published in 2018 by Simon & Schuster and won the 2019 Pulitzer Prize for History.

Film adaptation
In April 2019, it was reported that a feature film adaptation of the book was being produced by Barack Obama and Michelle Obama in partnership with Netflix. As of 2022, however, no further developments had been reported.

In 2022, Frederick Douglass: In Five Speeches, a documentary film based on the book, was released by HBO on various streaming platforms.

Awards and honors
 2019 Bancroft Prize, winner
 2019 Francis Parkman Prize, winner
 2019 Lincoln Prize, winner
 2019 Mark Lynton History Prize, shortlist
 2019 Plutarch Award, winner
 2019 Pulitzer Prize for History, winner
 2018 Los Angeles Times Book Prize for Biography, winner

References

Pulitzer Prize for History-winning works
2018 non-fiction books
Books about Frederick Douglass
Simon & Schuster books
American biographies
Books by David W. Blight
Biographies about African-American people
Bancroft Prize-winning works